The following is a list of vehicles manufactured by the Ford Motor Company under the Ford marque.

Current production vehicles

Former production vehicles

1900–1929

1940–1949 

Notes

1930–1939 

Notes

1950–1959 

Notes

1960–1969 

Notes

1970–1979 

Notes

1980–1989 

Notes

1990–1999 

Notes

2000–2009 

Notes

2010–2019 

Notes

Tractors 

 N-series
  NAA (a.k.a.; Golden Jubilee)
 600 Series  
 Workmaster
 Powermaster
Ford *000 "Thousand" series
 1000, 2000, 3000, 4000, 5000, 6000, 7000, 8000, and 9000

Ford *600 "Six-Hundred" and *700 "Seven-Hundred" series
 1600, 2600, 3600, 4600, 5600, 6600, 7600 (Four cylinder, utility, straddle mount)
 5700, 6700, 7700 (Row-crop versions of their 600 series counterparts) 
 8600, 9600 (Six-cylinder row-crop)
 8700, 9700 (Later version of their 600 series counterparts.)

Also, since the 8000 and up models were only made in the US, the 8100 and 8200 models were produced in Europe to meet the market's need for a 100 hp+ tractor. This was done by using the 7600 transmission and rear end and mating it to the Ford six-cylinder industrial engine with a special cast iron subframe for added strength.

Ford **10 series
 2810, 2910, 3610, 3910, 4110, 4610, 5110, 5610, 6610, 6710, 7410, 7610, 7710, 7910, and 8210 (Mark I, II and III)
 7810, 6810, and 6410(Mark II and III)

Ford TW series
 TW10, TW20, and TW30
 TW5, TW15, TW25, and TW35
 TW15 Mark II, TW25 Mark II, and TW 35 Mark II
Ford **30 Utility series
 3230, 3430, 3930, 3930 turbo, 4130, 4630, 4630 turbo, 4830, and 5030 (small tractors)

Ford 8*30 Powershift series

 8530, 8630, 8730, and 8830 (140-190 hp)(Mark III)

Ford **40 series
 5640, 6640,7740, 7840, 8240, and 8340

In 1986, Ford Motor Company expanded its agricultural holdings when it purchased the Sperry-New Holland implement line from Sperry Corporation, and named their agricultural division Ford New Holland Inc. The following year, Versatile was purchased, giving Ford a complete agricultural lineup. In 1988 Ford Motor Company sold 80% of Ford-New Holland Inc. to Fiat, and in 1991 Fiat acquired the remaining 20%, with the agreement to stop using the Ford brand by 2000. By 1999, Fiat had discontinued the use of both its own and the Ford name, and united them both under the New Holland brand.

Buses

 70 (1936–1937)
 81-B (1937–1938)
 91-B (1938–1939)
 09-B (1939–1940)
 19-B (1940–1941)
 29-B (1941–1942)
 49-B (1944)
 59-B (1945–1947)
 69-B (1946–1947)
 79-B (1945–1947)

School bus - for North American market

 Ford Transit Bus (1936–1947)
 Various third party manufactures use Ford E-series and F-series chassis to build mini school buses used in Canada and the United States:
 Ford Minibus using F450 chassis
 Ford Minibus using E350 (formerly Econoline 350)
 Ford E450 Super Duty minibus
 Ford MB series minibus - IV models 100, 100A, 200 and 200C Super Duty
 Ford MBC series buses IV models 200, 200C, 300, 300D, 800
 Ford B-Series Type C conventional chassis used by third party manufactures to build full size school buses for North American market

Commercial bus
 Ford Specialty Trolley - classic North American trolley car shell with Ford truck chassis; used as tourist shuttle buses

Transit/suburban bus

 Ford G997
 Ford R-Series - for European market 1960s to 1980s
 Ford Trader
 Ford Hawke
 Ford ET7 with Casha bodywork
 Ford 19B, 29B
 Ford 72B
 Ford ET7 Aqualina

Military 
Ford was a military contractor in North American clients during World War I and II:

 1917 Ford Model-T - World War I ambulance
 M1918 
 Universal Carrier MK. I and MK. II 
 T16 Universal Carrier
 T17 Deerhound armored car
 M8 Greyhound armored car 
 Bomb service truck - based on Model 19F light truck
 GTB ("Burma Jeep") 
 GP / GPW  (1941–1945)
 GPA 
 M38CDN
 M38A1CDN
 M151 (jeep)
 M656 
 Many versions of trucks and cars built by Ford in Canada for military during WWII. e.g. Ford F8, F15, F15A, F30, F60S, F60L, FAT, C11ADF etc.

Notes

Concept and movie cars

 Ford 021C (1999)
 Ford 24.7 Coupe (2000)
 Ford 24.7 Pickup (2000)
 Ford 24.7 Wagon (2000)
 Ford 4-Trac (2006)
 Ford 427 (2003)
 Ford AC (1982)
 Ford Aerostar (1984)
 Ford Aerovan (1981)
 Ford AFV (1982)
 Ford Airstream (2007)
 Ford Allegro (1963)
 Ford Allegro II (1967)
 Ford Alpe (1996)
 Ford Altair (1983)
 Ford APV (1984)
 Ford Arioso (1994)
 Ford Atlas (2013)
 Ford Avantgarde (1981)
 Ford Aurora (1964)
 Ford Aurora II (1969)
 Ford B-Max (2011)
 Ford Barchetta (1983)
 Ford Brezza (1982)
 Ford Bronco (2004)
 Ford Bronco DM-1 (1988)
 Ford Bronco Dune Duster (1966–1968)
 Ford Bronco Wildflower (1971)
 Ford Bronco Montana Lobo (1981)
 Ford Carousel (1972)
 Ford Cobra 230 ME (1986)
 Ford City Star (1970)
 Ford Cockpit (1982)
 Ford Coins (1974)
 Ford Comuta (1967)
 Ford Connecta (1992)
 Ford Contour (1991)
 Ford Corrida (1978)
 Ford Cougar (1956)
 Ford Cougar 406 (1962)
 Ford Cougar II (1963)
 Ford DePaolo (1958)
 Ford Desert Excursion (2000)
 Ford e.go (2000, Vietnam)
 Ford Econocar (1982)
 Ford EcoSport (2012)
 Ford Econoline Apartment (1966)
 Ford Econoline Kilimanjaro (1970)
 Ford Eltec (1985)
 Ford Equator (2001, 2005)
 Ford Evos (2011)
 Ford EX (2001)
 Ford Explorer America (2008)
 Ford Explorer Drifter (1992)
 Ford Explorer Sportsman (2001)
 Ford Explorer SUV#1973|Ford Explorer SUV (1973)
 Ford F-150 Lightning Rod (2001)
 Ford F-150 Street (1990)
 Ford F-250 Super Chief (2006)
 Ford FAB1 (modified Thunderbird)
 Ford Faction (2003)
 Ford Fairlane (2005)
 Ford Fiera (1968)
 Ford Fiesta Bebop (1990)
 Ford Fiesta Fantasy (1978)
 Ford Fiesta GTX (1980)
 Ford Fiesta ST (2011)
 Ford Fiesta Tuareg (1978)
 Ford Fiesta Urba (1989)
 Ford Flair (1982)
 Ford Flashback (1975)
 Ford Focus (1992, 1998)
 Ford Focus MA (2002)
 Ford Focus Vignale (2004)
 Ford Forty-Nine (2001)
 Ford Freestyle FX (2003)
 Ford FX-Atmos (1954)
 Ford Galaxie GT A Go-Go (1966)
 Ford HFX Aerostar (1987)
 Ford GloCar (2003)
 Ford Granada Altair (1980)
 Ford GTK (1979)
 Ford GT-P (1966)
 Ford GT40 (2002)
 Ford GT70 (1971)
 Ford GT80 (1978)
 Ford GT90 (1995)
 Ford Gyron (1961)
 Ford Indigo (1996)
 Ford Interceptor (2007)
 Ford Iosis (2005)
 Ford Iosis X (2006)
 Ford Iosis MAX (2009)
 Ford IXG (1960)
 Ford La Galaxie (1958)
 Ford La Tosca (1955)
 Ford Libre (1998)
 Ford LTD Black Pearl (1966)
 Ford LTD Berline I (1971)
 Ford LTD Berline II (1972)
 Ford LTD Experimental Safety Vehicle (1973)
 Ford Lucano (1978)
 Ford Lynx (1996)
 Ford Mach I Levacar (1959)
 Ford Mach 2 (1967)
 Ford Magic Cruiser (1966)
 Ford Manx (1975)
 Ford Maverick Runabout (1970)
 Ford Maverick Estate Coupe (1971)
 Ford Maverick LTD (1972)
 Ford Maxima (1963)
 Ford Maya (1984)
 Ford Maya II ES (1985)
 Ford Maya II EM (1985)
 Ford Megastar (1977)
 Ford Megastar II (1978)
 Ford Microsport (1978)
 Ford Mighty F-350 Tonka (2002)
 Ford MiniMax (1976)
 Ford Model U (2003)
 Ford Muroc (1950)
 Ford Mustang (2004)
 Ford Mustang I (1962)
 Ford Mustang II (1963)
 Ford Mustang II Sportiva (1974)
 Ford Mustang III (1978)
 Ford Mustang Ghia Vignale (1984)
 Ford Mustang Giugiaro
 Ford Mustang IMSA (1980)
 Ford Mustang Mach I (1965)
 Ford Mustang Mach II (1970)
 Ford Mustang Mach III (1993)
 Ford Mustang Milano (1970)
 Ford Mustang RSX (1979)
 Ford Mustang PPG (1984)
 Ford Mustela II (1973)
 Ford Mystere (1955)
 Ford Navarre (1980)
 Ford Nucleon (1958)
 Ford P2000 (1999)
 Ford Pinto Sportiva (1973)
 Ford Plastic Car (1941)
 Ford Pockar (1981)
 Ford Powerforce (1997)
 Ford Powerstroke (1994)
 Ford Prima (1976)
 Ford Probe I (1979)
 Ford Probe II (1980)
 Ford Probe III (1981)
 Ford Probe IV (1982)
 Ford Probe V (1985)
 Ford Prodigy (2000)
 Ford Prototype (Colani) (1989)
 Ford Quicksilver (1982)
 Ford Ranchero Scrambler (1969)
 Ford Ranger II (1967)
 Ford Ranger III (1968)
 Ford Ranger Force 5 (1991)
 Ford Ranger Jukebox (1993)
 Ford Ranger Powerforce (1999)
 Ford Reflex (2006)
 Ford SAV (2005)
 Ford Saetta (1996)
 Ford Saguaro (1988)
 Ford Seattle-ite XXI (1962)
 Ford Selene II (1962)
 Ford Shelby Cobra (2004)
 Ford Shelby GR-1 (2004)
 Ford Shoccc Wave (1990)
 Ford Shuttler (1981)
 Ford Splash (1988)
 Ford Sport-Trac (2005)
 Ford Sport-Trac Adrenalin (2005)
 Ford Sportiva II (1974)
 Ford Start (2001)
 Ford Surf (1990)
 Ford sub-B (1993)
 Ford Super Chief (2006)
 Ford Super Cobra (1969)
 Ford Super Gnat (1981)
 Ford Synergy 2010 (1996)
 Ford Synthesis 2010 (1993)
 Ford SYNUS (2005)
 Ford Syrtis (1953)
 Ford Techna (1968)
 Ford TH!NK
 Ford Thunderbird Italien (1963)
 Ford Thunderbird Golden Palomino (1964)
 Ford Thunderbird Town Landau (1965)
 Ford Thunderbird Saturn I (1968)
 Ford Thunderbird Saturn II (1969)
 Ford Thunderbird PPG (1984)
 Ford Thunderbird (1999)
 Ford Thunderbird Sports Roadster (2001)
 Ford Thunderbird SuperCharged (2003)
 Ford Topaz (1982)
 Ford Torino Machete Style I (1968)
 Ford Torino Machete Style II (1969)
 Ford Transit Connect Taxi (2008)
 Ford Tridon (1971)
 Ford Trio (1983)
 Ford Turbine Truck (1964)
 Ford Turing Ka (1998)
 Ford Twister (1963)
 Ford Urban Car (1975)
 Ford Urby (1985)
 Ford Vertrek (2011)
 Ford Via (1989)
 Ford Vivace (1996)
 Ford Vignale TSX-4 (1984)
 Ford Vignale TSX-6 (1986)
 Ford Visos (2003)
 Ford Vega (1953)
 Ford Verve (2007–2008)
 Ford Volante (1958)
 Ford X-100 (1953)
 Ford X-1000 (1958)
 Ford X2000 (1958)
 Ford XP Bordinat Cobra (1965)
 Ford Zag (1990)
 Ford Zig (1990)

See also
 List of Mercury vehicles
List of Lincoln vehicles
Edsel
Frontenac
Merkur
Meteor
Monarch
List of Ford engines
 List of Ford platforms

References

 
Ford vehicles